Albin Storm (born January 21, 1997) is a Swedish professional ice hockey player. He is currently playing with Kalmar HC of the Hockeyettan (Div.1).

On November 27, 2014, Storm made his professional debut playing with Växjö Lakers during the 2014–15 SHL season.

References

External links

1997 births
Living people
Swedish ice hockey forwards
Västerviks IK players
Växjö Lakers players
People from Lidköping Municipality
Sportspeople from Västra Götaland County